Caladenia javanica is a species of plant in the orchid family, Orchidaceae and is endemic to Indonesia. It has a single linear leaf and an erect, hairy stem with one or two flowers. The sepals and petals are lance-shaped to oblong and the labellum has purple lines and yellow calli. This orchid grows on grassy, rocky slopes. It was first formally described by Henry Ridley from an unpublished manuscript by John Bennett and the description was published in Henry Forbes's book, A Naturalist's Wanderings in the Eastern Archipelago.  The World Checklist of Selected Plant Families recognises Caladenia javanica as a synonym of Caladenia catenata.

References

javanica
Orchids of Indonesia
Plants described in 1885